Atlanta, the capital and largest city of the U.S. state of Georgia, is home to at least 39 skyscrapers over  tall. Most of these are clustered around Peachtree Street in the Downtown, Midtown, and Buckhead neighborhoods, with the suburban city of Sandy Springs also being the site of several skyscrapers. The tallest building in Atlanta is the 55-story Bank of America Plaza, which rises  and was completed in 1992. Upon its completion Bank of America Plaza was the tallest building in the United States outside New York City and Chicago, and the 8th-tallest building in the U.S. overall. The second-tallest building in Atlanta is Truist Plaza, which rises .

The history of skyscrapers in Atlanta began with the completion in 1892 of the Equitable Building. The city later went through a major building boom, which began in the 1980s and continued until the mid 1990s; most of the city's skyscrapers, including its four tallest, have all been completed since 1985. Overall, the entire city had 17 completed skyscrapers that rise at least , more than any other city in the Southeastern United States except Miami, tenth total in the United States, and 61st in the world. Of the 20 tallest buildings in Georgia, 18 are located in Atlanta; the other two, Concourse Corporate Center V & VI are in the neighboring city of Sandy Springs.

History
The Equitable Building, completed in 1892, is generally regarded as the first high-rise in the city. Atlanta went through a major building boom from the mid-1980s to the early 1990s, during which the city saw the completion of 13 of its 40 tallest buildings, including the Bank of America Plaza, SunTrust Plaza, One Atlantic Center, and 191 Peachtree Tower. Atlanta entered another high-rise construction boom in the early 2000s.

Several of the downtown buildings were damaged in a major tornado in March 2008, scattering glass from several hundred feet. It took workers several days to clean the buildings and remove all of the loose shards of glass from the skyscrapers. No structural damage was reported, and by late 2010 each skyscraper had all of its windows replaced. Window blinds and other office objects from the tall buildings were found as far away as Oakland Cemetery.

Tallest buildings
This includes spires and architectural details but does not include antenna masts. An equal sign (=) following a rank indicates the same height between two or more buildings. The "Year" column indicates the year in which a building was completed.

Timeline of tallest buildings

This lists buildings that once held the title of tallest building in Atlanta.

Notes

References

Sources

External links
 Diagram of Atlanta skyscrapers on SkyscraperPage

Tallest
Atlanta
Atlanta